Daniel Schneider (born 11 December 1976) is a German politician for the SPD and since 2021 member of the Bundestag, the federal diet.

Life and politics 

Schneider was born 1976 in the West Germany city of Cuxhaven and studied economic stuff.
Schneider was directly elected to the Bundestag in 2021.

References 

Living people
1976 births
People from Cuxhaven
Social Democratic Party of Germany politicians
Members of the Bundestag 2021–2025
21st-century German politicians